Devorah Baron (also Dvora Baron) (27 November 1887  20 August 1956) was a pioneering Jewish writer, noted for writing in Modern Hebrew and for making a career as a Hebrew author. She has been called the "first Modern Hebrew woman writer". She wrote about 80 short stories, plus a novella titled Exiles. Additionally, she translated stories into Modern Hebrew.

Biography
Devorah Baron was born in Uzda, about 50 kilometers south-southwest of Minsk, which was then part of the Russian Empire. Her father, a rabbi, allowed her to attend the same Hebrew classes as boys, which was highly exceptional for the time, although she had to sit in the screened women’s area of the synagogue. Also, and again unusual for girls at the time, she completed high school and received a teaching credential in 1907. Baron published her first stories in 1902, at the age of 14, in the Hebrew-language newspaper Ha-Melits, which was edited at that time by Leon Rabinowitz. She appears in a photo of Yiddish writers in Vilna in 1909, when Mendele Moykher Sforim was visiting there, which is exceptional both because she is the only woman in the photo and because she does not appear in a similar photo of Vilna's Hebrew writers who posed with Sforim during his visit (the Hebrew writers having refused to have her—a woman—appear in their photo).

She was engaged to the author Moshe Ben-Eliezer, but he later broke it off.

In 1910, after her father’s death and later the destruction of her village in a pogrom, she immigrated to Palestine, settling in Neve Tzedek, a neighborhood the on outskirts of Jaffa that became part of Tel Aviv in 1909. In Palestine she became the literary editor of the Zionist-Socialist magazine Ha-Po’el ha-Za’ir (The Young Worker). She soon married the editor, the Zionist activist Yosef Aharonovitz (1877–1937). Along with other Jews in Palestine, they were deported to Egypt by the Ottoman government, but returned after the establishment of the British Mandate after the First World War. In 1922, Baron and her husband both resigned from the magazine. At this point, she went into seclusion, staying at her home until she died.

Literary career
When the Bialik Prize for writing was first established in Israel in 1934, she was its first recipient. She later was awarded the Rupin Prize in 1944 and the Brenner Prize for literature in 1951.

Although she wrote and published throughout her life, she went through two phases, first as an active, socially daring young woman, and then as a recluse.

When she was ailing and dependent on others, she referred to some of her earlier stories as “rags”. The common thread throughout her life was her dedication to the art of writing. "Seclusion" is not an exaggeration: She chose "not to step foot out of her house" even for her husband's funeral, although one eyewitness reported, "I saw her descend three steps and return to her house."  During this period she remained intellectually sharp and continued to write, composing "a group of stories depicting the world as seen through the window of an 'invalid's room' ("Be-Lev ha-Kerakh," in Parashiyyot)". Rachel Shazar notes that her stories, "animated by a deep empathy for the weak and the innocent," reflect profound learning: "No other woman writer in Israel was as familiar with the sources of Judaism as Devorah Baron."

During the latter part of her life she did some important literary translations into Hebrew, including Gustave Flaubert’s Madame Bovary. Though part of the Zionist movement, she wrote much about village life in the shtetls of Lithuania, "sometimes in near-poetic tones."

Published works 
Stories, Davar, 1927 (Sipurim) 
Hiding (story), Omanut, 1930 (Gniza) 
Small Things (stories), Omanut, 1933 (Ktanot) 
What Has Been (stories), Davar, 1939 (Ma She-Haya) 
For the Time Being (stories), Am Oved, 1943 (Le-Et Ata) 
From Over There (stories), Am Oved, 1946 (Mi-Sham) 
The Brickmaker (stories), Am Oved, 1947 (Ha-Laban) 
Sunbeams (stories), Am Oved, 1949 (Shavririm) 
Chapters (stories), Bialik Institute, 1951; ext. ed. 2000 (Parshiyot) 
Links (stories), Am Oved, 1953 (Chuliyot) 
From Yesterday (stories), Am Oved, 1955 (Me-Emesh) 
By the Way (stories), Sifriat Poalim, 1960 (Agav Orcha) 
Selected Stories, Yachdav/ The Hebrew Writers Association, 1969 
The Exiles (two novellas), Am Oved, 1970 (Ha-Golim) 
Three Stories, World Zionist Organization, 1975 (Shlosha Sipurim) 
Early Chapters (stories), Bialik Institute, 1988 (Parshiyot Mukdamot) 
Divorcing and Other Stories, Am Oved, 1997 (Kritot Ve-Sipurim Acherim) 
Shifra (stories), Babel, 2001 (Fradel; Shifra) 
Chapters (Parshiot), (Jerusalem 1951)
The First Day and Other Stories. Translated by Naomi Seidman and Chana Kronfeld. Berkeley: 2001
The Thorny Path and Other Stories, trans. Joseph Shachter (Jerusalem, 1969);
Also, translations into Hebrew, including Madame Bovary

Works about  Baron 
Aharonovitz, Zipporah. By the Way . Merhavyah: 1961. (Biography by her daughter)
Bernstein, Marc. 2001.  "Midrashj and marginality: The ‘Agunot of S. Y. Agnon and Devorah Baron." Hebrew Studies 42: 7-58. doi:10.1353/hbr.2001.0017
Baram, Einat Eshel. 2011. "Outline of a Gender Conflict: Notes on an Early Story by Dvora Baron." Women in Judaism 8.2. online
Govrin, Nurit. Ha-Maḥatsit ha-ri’shonah [Early chapters]: Devorah Baron . Jerusalem: Mosad Byaliḳ, 1988.
Jelen, Sheila. Intimations of Difference: Dvora Baron in the Modern Hebrew Renaissance. Syracuse: Syracuse University Press, 2007.
 Jelen, Sheila and Shachar Pinsker, eds. Hebrew, Gender, and Modernity: Critical responses to Dvora Baron’s fiction (Studies and texts in Jewish history and culture, 14). Bethesda, MD: University Press of Maryland, 2007.
Lieblich, Amia. Conversations with Dvora: An Experimental Biography of the First Modern Hebrew Woman Writer. Berkeley, CA: University of California Press, 1997.
Lieblich, Amia. Embroideries: Conversations with Devorah Baron . Jerusalem: Shoken, 1991.
Pagis, Ada, ed. Devorah Baron: Mivḥar ma’amare bikoret ‘al yetsiratah . Tel Aviv: ʻAm ʻoved, 1974.
Pinsker, Shachar. "Unraveling the yarn: intertexuality, gender, and cultural critique in the stories of Dvora Baron." Nashim: A Journal of Jewish Women's Studies & Gender Issues (2006): 244-279.
Rahman, Asmaa Abdel Karim Abdel. "Feminist trends in the products of Devorah Baron." LARK JOURNAL FOR PHILOSOPHY, LINGUISTICS AND SOCIAL SCIENCES''' 2, no. 33 (2019).
Seidman, Naomi. A Marriage Made in Heaven: The Sexual Politics of Hebrew and Yiddish. Berkeley, CA: University of California Press, 1997.
Zierler, Wendy. 1999. "In What World? Devorah Baron’s Fiction of Exile." Prooftexts'' 19: 127–150.

References

External links
biographical article from the Jewish Women's Archive
Institute for the Translation of Hebrew Literature
Baron "in the Closet" An Epistemology of the "Women's Section"

Brenner Prize recipients
Israeli women short story writers
Israeli short story writers
1887 births
1956 deaths
Emigrants from the Russian Empire to the Ottoman Empire
20th-century Israeli women writers
Burials at Trumpeldor Cemetery
Jewish women writers